For information on all Samford University sports, see Samford Bulldogs

The Samford Bulldogs baseball team is a varsity intercollegiate athletic team of Samford University in Homewood, Alabama, United States. The team is a member of the Southern Conference, which is part of the National Collegiate Athletic Association's Division I. The team plays its home games at Joe Lee Griffin Stadium in Homewood, Alabama. The Bulldogs are coached by Tony David.

Major League Baseball
Samford has had 32 Major League Baseball Draft selections since the draft began in 1965.

See also
List of NCAA Division I baseball programs

References

External links